DXCX (88.3 FM), broadcasting as Radyo ni Juan 88.3, is a radio station owned and operated by Rizal Memorial Colleges Broadcasting Corporation. Its studios and transmitter are located in Purok Cayambanan, Brgy. Grino, Tacurong.

On October 30, 2019, station manager Benjie Caballero was shot outside his home by two gunmen on a motorcycle. He died a month later due to pneumonia.

References

Radio stations established in 2019